Vieillevie is a commune in the department of Cantal in south-central France. The village stands on the north (right) bank of the River Lot, approximately 12 km west of Entraygues. The river here is the boundary between the departments of Cantal and Aveyron, and a bridge takes you from the village into Aveyron. The village is 32 km south of the large town of Aurillac and 35 km north of the large town of Rodez.

In the village are a castle, a church, a hotel with an excellent restaurant (Hotel de la Terrasse), and a shop/cafe which offers many services.

Population

Monuments
The Château de Vieillevie, a mediaeval castle modified in the 16th century, is in the centre of the village next to the Mairie. It is a monument historique.

See also
Communes of the Cantal department

References

Communes of Cantal